The Central Air Command is one of the five operational commands of the Indian Air Force. It is currently headquartered in Allahabad in Uttar Pradesh. It was formed on 19 March 1962, at Rani Kuthee, Calcutta.

History 
Due to the possibility of war with China, No. 1 Operational Group was formed on 27 May 1958 at Ranikuthee in Calcutta, to look after all the units. In 1959, it was upgraded to Eastern Air Force (EAF). In 1962, after the Sino-Indian War, EAF was moved to Shillong and Central Air Command (CAC) was formed on 19 March 1962 with its headquarters at Rani Kuthee, Calcutta (now Kolkata). Calcutta was considered an inappropriate location for the Central Air Command Headquarters and it was relocated to Allahabad in February 1966.

During the Indo-Pakistani War of 1965, CAC English Electric Canberras carried out 163 bombing and 33 close air support sorties against Pakistani forces, and raided Pakistan Air Force airbases at Mauripur, Multan, Sargodha, Peshawar, and Chaklala. Squadron Leader Charanjit Singh and Flt Lt Mangat Singh made a 'brilliant raid' on the night of 13–14 September 1965, by carrying out a major air base attacks at Peshawar. Three Mahavir Chakras were awarded to the members of Canberra squadrons. In a major attack, seven Canberras of No. 35 Squadron attacked the oil storage tanks at Karachi, destroying about 60% of Pakistan's oil reserves.

On 3 November 1988, during the 1988 Maldives coup d'état, Indian troops were airlifted to Maldives in two CAC Ilyushin Il-76s and landed at Hulule airport on a dark unlit runway. By 2.30am on 4 November the Indian forces completed their mission and safely brought back the President of Maldives.

In operation "Safed Sagar" during the Kargil war in 1999, CAC played a prominent role by successfully carrying out attacks on enemy bases.

The IAF's first exercise with a foreign air force (Garud) took place with the French Air Force in Gwalior in 2003 and CAC participated in an eight-day exercise. A number of joint exercises have been conducted with the United States Air Force, Royal Air Force, the Singapore Air Force and South African Air Force at Gwalior and Agra.

Organization

Squadrons include:

Air Officer Commanding-in-Chief

Operations 
The CAC mainly patrols the North Central part of India. It has airbases at Agra, Bareilly, Gorakhpur, Gwalior and Prayagraj and some units are located at Bihta, Darbhanga, Bakshi-ka-Talab, Nagpur, Kanpur, Nainital, Memaura and Varanasi.

The CAC operates fixed-wing aircraft such as the Mirage 2000, Antonov An-32, Ilyushin Il-76 and Dornier 228; and helicopters such as the Mil Mi-8, Mil Mi-17 and Mil Mi-26.

See also
 Indian Air Force
 No. 22 Squadron, Indian Air Force
 Operation Meghdoot
 Orissa Super Cyclone

References

Commands of the Indian Air Force
Military units and formations established in 1962
Military units and formations of the Indian Air Force
1962 establishments in West Bengal